In mathematics, the Dixmier trace, introduced by , is a non-normal trace on a space of linear operators on a Hilbert space larger than the space of trace class operators.  Dixmier traces are examples of singular traces.

Definition
If H is a Hilbert space, then L1,∞(H) is the space of compact linear operators T on H such that the norm

is finite, where the numbers μi(T) are the eigenvalues of |T| arranged in decreasing order.  Let 
.
The Dixmier trace Trω(T) of T is defined for positive operators T of L1,∞(H) to be

where limω is a scale-invariant positive "extension" of the usual limit, to all bounded sequences.  In other words, it has the following properties:
limω(αn) ≥ 0 if all αn ≥ 0 (positivity)
limω(αn) = lim(αn) whenever the ordinary limit exists
limω(α1, α1, α2, α2, α3, ...) = limω(αn) (scale invariance)

There are many such extensions (such as a Banach limit of  α1, α2, α4, α8,...) so there are many different Dixmier traces. 
As the Dixmier trace is linear, it extends by linearity to all operators of L1,∞(H).
If the Dixmier trace of an operator is independent of the choice of limω then the operator is called measurable.

Properties
Trω(T) is linear in T.
If T ≥ 0 then Trω(T) ≥ 0
If S is bounded then Trω(ST) = Trω(TS)
Trω(T) does not depend on the choice of inner product on H.
Trω(T) = 0 for all trace class operators T, but there are compact operators for which it is equal to 1.

A trace φ is called normal if φ(sup xα) = sup φ( xα) for every bounded increasing directed family of positive operators.

Examples
A compact self-adjoint operator with eigenvalues 1, 1/2, 1/3, ... has Dixmier trace equal to 1.

If the eigenvalues μi of the positive operator T have the property that 

converges for Re(s)>1 and extends to a meromorphic function near s=1 with at most a simple pole at s=1, then the Dixmier trace
of T is the residue at s=1 (and in particular is independent of the choice of ω).

 showed that Wodzicki's noncommutative residue  of a pseudodifferential operator on a manifold M of order -dim(M) is equal to its Dixmier trace.

References
Albeverio, S.; Guido, D.; Ponosov, A.; Scarlatti, S.: Singular traces and compact operators.  J. Funct. Anal. 137 (1996), no. 2, 281—302.

See also 

 Singular trace

Von Neumann algebras
Hilbert space
Operator theory
Trace theory